Jay Johnson may refer to:

Jay Johnson, an alternate spelling of Jeh Johnson (born 1957), former U.S. Secretary of Homeland Security
Jay Johnson (singer), Detroit doo-wop bass-baritone singer
Jay Johnson (ventriloquist) (born 1949)
Jay Johnson (runner) (born 1959); American mountain runner
Jay Johnson (pitcher) (born Canada, 1989)
Jay Johnson (baseball coach) (born 1977)
Jay Johnson (American football coach) (born 1969)
Jay Kenneth Johnson, (born 1977) American actor of Days of Our Lives
Jay L. Johnson, U.S. retired Navy Chief of Naval Operations and CEO of General Dynamics Corporation
Jay W. Johnson (1943–2009), U.S. Democratic congressman from Wisconsin and director of the United States Mint
Jay W. Johnson (composer), see Harry for the Holidays
Jay Johnson Morrow (1870–1937) governor of the Panama Canal Zone
Jay Johnson (musician), guitar player and singer for Blackfoot and Skinny Molly

See also
Jay Johnston (disambiguation)
Jason Johnson (disambiguation)